is a passenger railway station located in the town of Shin'onsen, Mikata District, Hyōgo, Japan, operated by West Japan Railway Company (JR West).

Lines

Station layout
The station consists of one ground-level side platform serving  single bi-directional track. The station is unattended.

Adjacent stations

History
Kutani Station opened on March 1, 1912.

Passenger statistics
In fiscal 2016, the station was used by an average of 12 passengers daily

Surrounding area
 Kutani Post Office
 Momokan Pass / Momokan Tunnel

See also
List of railway stations in Japan

References

External links

 Station Official Site

Railway stations in Hyōgo Prefecture
Sanin Main Line
Railway stations in Japan opened in 1912
Shin'onsen, Hyōgo